Anna-Lena Grönefeld and Meghann Shaughnessy were the defending champions, but chose not to participate that year.

Yan Zi and Zheng Jie won in the final 6–4, 7–6(5), against Tatiana Perebiynis and Tatiana Poutchek.

Seeds

Draw

Draw

External links
Draw

Medibank International Women's Doubles
Women's Doubles